The Sikorsky S-45 was a proposed double-deck  transoceanic flying boat originally designed in 1938 by Sikorsky Aircraft for Pan Am. The high wing monoplane featured a single-step hull with a triple-tail and was to be powered by six Wright R-3350 Duplex-Cyclone engines which were being developed at the time. The aircraft would have competed with the Boeing 314 but no examples of the S-45 were ever manufactured.

Specifications

References

S-45
1930s United States airliners
Flying boats
High-wing aircraft